Jennifer Westacott  is an Australian business executive. She has been chief executive of the Business Council of Australia (BCA) since 2011. On 1 January 2023 she will become chancellor of Western Sydney University, while continuing in her role with the BCA.

She grew up in Springfield in New South Wales, Australia and completed her secondary education at Henry Kendall High School. She completed a Bachelor of Arts (Honours) from the University of New South Wales. She also holds a Graduate Management Certificate from the Monash Mt Eliza Business School and was a Chevening Scholar at the London School of Economics.

Following a career in the NSW and Victorian public sectors, she was a senior partner at KPMG in Sydney, Australia from 2005 to 2011, before assuming the role of chief executive of the Business Council of Australia. She is also a non-executive director of Wesfarmers.

Recognition 
She received an honorary doctorate from the University of New South Wales in 2017. In 2018, Westacott was awarded an Officer of the Order of Australia (AO) for her service to policy development and reform, cross sector collaboration, equity and business.

References

Living people
Year of birth missing (living people)
Officers of the Order of Australia
21st-century Australian businesspeople
University of New South Wales alumni
Australian women in business